Geschichten aus der Heimat is a German television series. It was released in then-West Germany on 31 December 1983. It was released in color, as was norm. It won a Golden Camera award in 1991, and best German actor was Heinz Reincke.

Production Companies
Hessischer Rundfunk (HR)
Norddeutscher Rundfunk (NDR)
Saarländischer Rundfunk (SR)
Sender Freies Berlin (SFB)
Westdeutscher Rundfunk (WDR)

See also
List of German television series

References
 

1983 German television series debuts
1994 German television series endings
German-language television shows
Das Erste original programming